Annahilt / Anahilt is a village and civil parish in north County Down, Northern Ireland. It is 7.5 miles (12 kilometres) south of Lisburn, and about 14 miles south-west of Belfast, on the main road between Ballynahinch and Hillsborough. In the 2001 Census the village had a population of 1,148. Annahilt has a distinctive drumlin setting, with a small wooded estate on a ridge to the west, and panoramic views on the approaches to the village.

Annahilt has a primary school, hair dressers, Scout Hall, an Orange Hall, a residential care home and a play park. There is also a business park to the north, on the Glebe Road. Annahilt also has a three-star caravan site, known as the 'Lakeside View Caravan Park', on the Magheraconluce Road.

History 
Maps of the early 19th century show little development at Annahilt beyond a schoolhouse and a small number of dwellings near the main crossroads. The settlement grew much in the second half of the 20th century. The primary school was founded in 1801.

A church was founded on the site of the current Annahilt Church of Ireland (Church of the Ascension) in the 8th century. Founded by Saint Molibba, it was known as Enaceilte. The church was rebuilt in 1422 and again in 1741, while the present church was built in 1856. The only remaining part of the medieval church is a ruined tower, which sits in the graveyard.

Transport
Translink (Ulsterbus) operate bus services linking the village with Lisburn, Belfast, Dromara and Newcastle.

Demography 
Annahilt is classified as a village by the Northern Ireland Statistics and Research Agency (NISRA) (i.e. with population between 1,000 and 2,250 people). On Census day (29 April 2001) there were 1148 people living in Annahilt. Of these:
27.2% were aged under 16 years and 13.3% were aged 60 and over
48.3% of the population were male and 51.7% were female
5.1% were from a Catholic background and 91.3% were from a Protestant background
2.6% of people aged 16–74 were unemployed

Civil parish of Annahilt
The civil parish is mainly in the historic barony of Iveagh Lower, Lower Half, with one townland in the barony of Kinelarty.

Townlands
The civil parish contains the following townlands:

 Aghnaleck
 Ballycrune
 Ballykeel Lougherne
 Ballylintagh
 Ballymurphy
 Cargacreevy
 Cargygray
 Carricknadarriff
 Cluntagh
 Glebe
 Magheraconluce

See also
List of civil parishes of County Down

References

External links 
Annahilt Primary School

Villages in County Down